Christine Margaret Grant (born 1962) now Christine Kelly is an alpine skier from New Zealand.

In the 1984 Winter Olympics at Sarajevo, Grant came 26th in the downhill event. Her brother Bruce Grant competed at the same Olympics, also in alpine skiing.

References

External links  
 
 

Living people
1962 births
New Zealand female alpine skiers
Olympic alpine skiers of New Zealand
Alpine skiers at the 1984 Winter Olympics
20th-century New Zealand women